Gopal Krushna Rath (1945 – 2016) was an Indian Odia poet. He won Sahitya Akademi award for Odia literature in 2014 for his poetry collection Bipula Diganta.

Life 
Rath was born in Sambalpur, on 3 August 1945. He grew up in Sambalpur town and studied to become a law professional. He started his career as a judge; however he changed his career to academics.
He retired as a Professor in Law from Sambalpur University. He was a former Chairman of the PG Council of Sambalpur University.  He was also member of Sahitya Akademi advisory board 

He was married to Dr Kiranbala Rath, an academician, author and an orator. They had four children but lost three of them.

Rath renounced material world and became a sanyasi in 2014. He was also known as Srimat Swami Gururupananda Saraswati Maharaj. Along with Gopal Krushna, his wife also took to Sanyas and is known as Maa Kalyanmayee Saraswati.

Rath died in Pune on 30 December 2016.

Works 
Rath started writing poems when he was in high school. He published poems in most Odia magazines.  Rath won Sahitya Akademi award for his poetry collection "Bipula Diganta". He authored six anthologies of poems: 
 Ekla Manisha (Friends Publishers,1980)
 Kete dura (1990),
 Kuni Pua O Nishpaapa  Sakaala (2000) 
 Bipula Diganta (Lark Books, 2010),
 Bihwala Belabhoomi (Pakshighara Publications, 2013) 
 Aruna Udbhaasa (Pakshighara Publications, 2016)

Awards 
 Sahitya Akademi 2014
 Odisha Sahitya Akademi 2003 
 Jhankar Poetry Award 1984
 SAHITYA PRUTHVI SAMMAN 2012
 BALDEV SAHITYA SANSAD SAMMAN 2007

References

Odia-language poets
20th-century Indian poets
1945 births
2016 deaths
Odia-language writers
Recipients of the Sahitya Akademi Award in Odia
Writers from Odisha
Poets from Odisha
Sambalpur University alumni